Canada national basketball team may refer to:
 Canada men's national basketball team
 Canada women's national basketball team
 Canada men's national under-19 basketball team
 Canada men's national under-17 basketball team
 Canada women's national under-19 basketball team
 Canada women's national under-17 basketball team